Alison Jane Rose (born 10 December 1961) is Principal of Newnham College, Cambridge. She is a former British diplomat and was the British ambassador to Belgium from 2014 until 2019.

Early life and education
Rose was born in Coventry and studied at Barr’s Hill Grammar School. She then went on to read modern history at Newnham College, Cambridge. She was the first in her family to gain a degree.

Career
Rose joined the Civil Service in 1983, working in the Manpower Services Commission. She joined the Foreign and Commonwealth Office in 1999 and developed an EU specialism and worked for the FCO in Paris, London and Brussels. She was appointed as British ambassador to Belgium in October 2013, and was in post from 11 August 2014 to July 2019.

Rose was elected by Newnham College, Cambridge, as the principal-elect in January 2019, and was formally installed in office in October 2019, as the thirteenth Principal of Newnham. (2021-2). Rose's election was warmly welcomed by fellow alumnae and colleagues on social media.

References

Ambassadors of the United Kingdom to Belgium
People from Coventry
Alumni of Newnham College, Cambridge
Living people
1961 births
British women ambassadors
Principals of Newnham College, Cambridge